The 2008–09 Portland State Vikings men's basketball team represented Portland State University during the 2008–09 NCAA Division I men's basketball season. The Vikings, led by head coach Ken Bone, played their home games at the Peter Stott Center and were members of the Big Sky Conference. They finished the season 23–10, 11–5 in Big Sky play to finish second in the conference regular season standings. They won the Big Sky tournament to earn an automatic bid – for the second straight season – to the NCAA tournament. As No. 13 seed in the East region, the Vikings were defeated in the opening round by Xavier.

Roster

Schedule and results

|-
!colspan=9 style=| Regular season

|-
!colspan=9 style=| Big Sky tournament

|-
!colspan=9 style=| NCAA Tournament Tournament

References

Portland State Vikings men's basketball seasons
Portland State
Portland State
Portland State Vikings men's basketball
Portland State Vikings men's basketball
Port
Port